Burning Daylight is a 1928 silent dramatic action adventure film directed by Charles Brabin and starring Milton Sills and Doris Kenyon, a real-life married couple. It was produced and distributed by First National Pictures and based on the 1910 novel of the same name by Jack London. It was previously filmed by Metro Pictures in 1920.

Cast

Milton Sills as Burning Daylight
Doris Kenyon as 'The Virgin'
Arthur Stone as 'French Louie'
Guinn "Big Boy" Williams as 'English Harry'
Lawford Davidson as Morton
Jane Winton as Martha Fairbee
Stuart Holmes as Blake
Edmund Breese as John Dossett
Howard Truesdale as Letton
Frank Hagney as Johnson
Harry Northrup as The Stranger

Preservation status
The film is preserved in the Library of Congress collection.  The film is also available on the DVD format.

References

External links

1928 films
American silent feature films
Films directed by Charles Brabin
First National Pictures films
Films based on American novels
Films based on works by Jack London
American black-and-white films
American adventure drama films
American action adventure films
1920s American films
Silent American drama films
Silent adventure films